Mohamed Hamdy Zaky, known simply as Mohamed Hamdy (born 13 December 1991) is an Egyptian professional footballer who plays for Egyptian club Ismaily in the Egyptian Premier League, as a striker.

Hamdy played with Egypt U20 in 2011 FIFA U-20 World Cup.

Hamdy made his debut with Egypt national football team on June 8, 2015, against Malawi.

Career statistics

References

External links

1991 births
Living people
Egyptian footballers
2013 African U-20 Championship players
Egypt youth international footballers
Association football forwards
Sportspeople from Alexandria
Egypt international footballers